Herbert Cock (7 October 1900 – January 1977) was an English professional footballer who played as a forward and made one appearance in the Football League for Brentford.

Career
In late January 1921, Cock joined Brentford on a contract running until the end of the 1920–21 season. He made one appearance in the Football League, playing in a 1–0 Third Division defeat to Plymouth Argyle on 7 May 1921. He subsequently joined Queens Park Rangers and then Arsenal in September 1921, but failed to make a senior appearance for either club.

Personal life 
Cock was the younger brother of footballers Jack and Donald. Prior to joining Brentford in January 1921, he served in the Royal Navy.

Career statistics

References

English footballers
English Football League players
Brentford F.C. players
1900 births
1977 deaths
Association football forwards
Royal Navy sailors
Sportspeople from Slough
20th-century Royal Navy personnel
Footballers from Berkshire